2019–20 Syed Mushtaq Ali Trophy was the twelfth edition of Syed Mushtaq Ali Trophy, a Twenty20 competition in India. It took place between 8 November and 1 December 2019. Karnataka were the defending champions.

The tournament retained the same format as the previous edition of the competition. The tournament had five groups, with two groups containing seven teams and three groups with eight teams. The top two teams in each group qualified for the Super League section of the tournament, with the teams then split into two further groups of five teams. The top two teams of each of the Super League groups progressed to the semi-finals.

On the opening day of the tournament, Karnataka beat Uttarakhand by nine wickets, setting a new record for the most consecutive wins in T20 matches in India, with fifteen. Six rain-affected matches from the first day of the tournament were rescheduled to take place on 18 November 2019.

Following the conclusion of matches played on 17 November 2019, Baroda and Karnataka from Group A, Tamil Nadu and Rajasthan from Group B, and Mumbai and Haryana from Group D had all progressed to the Super League stage of the tournament. After the final day of group stage matches, Maharashtra and Punjab from Group C, and Delhi and Jharkhand from Group E had also progressed to the Super League.

From the Super League, Haryana, Karnataka, Rajasthan and Tamil Nadu had advanced to the semi-finals. In the first semi-final, between Haryana and Karnataka, Abhimanyu Mithun took five wickets in one over for Karnataka, including a hat-trick. Karnataka won the match by eight wickets to advance to the final. In the second semi-final, Tamil Nadu beat Rajasthan by seven wickets to progress. In the final, Karnataka beat Tamil Nadu by one run to defend their title.

League stage

Group A

Group B

Group C

Group D

Group E

Super League

Points table

Group A

Group B

Group A

Group B

Finals

References

External links
 Series home at ESPN Cricinfo

2019 in Indian cricket
Domestic cricket competitions in 2019–20